Culicoides selandicus is a species of midges found in Scandinavia. It can be differentiated from its cogenerated by wing and maxillary palp characteristics.

References

selandicus
Nematoceran flies of Europe
Diptera of Scandinavia
Insects described in 2015